Charlie Semine (born October 28, 1980) is an American actor, known for BrainDead, Mercy and The Following.

Life and career
Born in Marblehead, Massachusetts to Christian and Deborah, Semine is a graduate of Marblehead High School, Tufts University and Yale School of Drama. He lives in New York City with his wife Roxanna Hope Raja.

In 2017 he performed in the Broadway premiere of Junk by Ayad Akhtar at Lincoln Center Theater.

Filmography

References

External links
 

Living people
American male film actors
American male television actors
People from Marblehead, Massachusetts
American male stage actors
21st-century American male actors
Yale School of Drama alumni
Tufts University alumni
Marblehead High School alumni
1979 births